The John Sherman Cooper Power Station is a coal-fired power plant owned and operated by the East Kentucky Cooperative near Somerset, Kentucky. It is actually closest to the smaller city of Burnside. It is named after John Sherman Cooper, a US Senator from Kentucky.

Emissions Data
 2006  Emissions: 1,931,758 tons
 2006  Emissions:
 2006  Emissions per MWh:
 2006  Emissions:
 2005 Mercury Emissions:

See also

Coal mining in Kentucky

References

External resources
http://www.ekpc.coop

Energy infrastructure completed in 1965
Coal-fired power plants in Kentucky
Buildings and structures in Pulaski County, Kentucky
1965 establishments in Kentucky